Cronopio may refer to either of the following:

Cronopio (literature), a class of literary characters
Cronopio (mammal), a prehistoric animal